Khatuna Narimanidze (born 2 February 1974) is an athlete from Georgia.  She competes in archery.

2004 Summer Olympics
Narimanidze represented Georgia at the 2004 Summer Olympics.  She placed 41st in the women's individual ranking round with a 72-arrow score of 620.  In the first round of elimination, she faced 24th-ranked Almudena Gallardo of Spain.  Narimanidze lost 148-132 in the 18-arrow match, placing 51st overall in women's individual archery.

2008 Summer Olympics
At the 2008 Summer Olympics in Beijing Narimanidze finished her ranking round with a total of 663 points. This gave her the 4th seed (the first non South Korean) for the final competition bracket in which she faced Dorji Dema in the first round, beating the archer from Bhutan with 107-97. In the second round she was too strong for Leydis Brito from Venezuela with 111-98, but in the third round she was eliminated by 20th seed Mariana Avitia with 109-108.

2016 Summer Olympics
Narimanidze represented Georgia at the 2016 Summer Olympics in Rio de Janeiro.

References

External links
 
 

1974 births
Living people
Olympic archers of Georgia (country)
Archers at the 2000 Summer Olympics
Archers at the 2004 Summer Olympics
Archers at the 2008 Summer Olympics
Archers at the 2016 Summer Olympics
Female archers from Georgia (country)
Archers at the 2015 European Games
European Games medalists in archery
European Games silver medalists for Georgia (country)
21st-century women from Georgia (country)